Zabrušany is a municipality and village in Teplice District in the Ústí nad Labem Region of the Czech Republic. It has about 1,100 inhabitants.

Administrative parts
Villages of Štěrbina, Straky, Všechlapy and Želénky are administrative parts of Zabrušany.

References

Villages in Teplice District